Morelia is a genus of large snakes in the family Pythonidae found in Indonesia, New Guinea, and throughout Australia. Currently, up to eight species are recognized.

In general, these snakes are arboreal to semiarboreal, spending much of their lives in the forest canopy.

Geographic range
Species are found from Indonesia in the Maluku Islands, east through New Guinea, including the Bismarck Archipelago, and in Australia.

Species
Seven species are recognized:

) Not including the nominate subspecies.
T) Type species.

Hybrids
 Morelia spilota X viridis

References

External links

 
Snake genera
Taxa named by John Edward Gray